Singapore Korean International School (SKIS) is a South Korean international school in Singapore. Founded in March 1993, It covers kindergarten through senior high school. The first students graduated in February 1995 and the school held a relocation ceremony in November 2010.

, it had 450 students at the pre-school, primary, middle and high school levels.

References

External links

 Singapore Korean International School
 Singapore Korean International School 

Korean international schools in Asia
International schools in Singapore
1993 establishments in Singapore
Educational institutions established in 1993